Warren Wells (November 14, 1942 – December 27, 2018) was an American professional football player who was a wide receiver for five seasons in the National Football League (NFL) and American Football League (AFL). He played with the Detroit Lions and Oakland Raiders. He had success with the Raiders with one 1,000-yard season and a Pro Bowl nomination, but saw his career end because of legal troubles.

Early life
Wells grew up in Beaumont, Texas, where he attended Hebert High School; he was one of 16 pro footballers honored with the keys to the city in 1971. He attended Texas Southern University until 1964 when he was taken in the 12th round of the 1964 NFL Draft by the Detroit Lions.

Professional football career
He made appearances in nine games with the Lions and made two receptions for 21 yards for his rookie year. However, he was drafted into the U.S. Army after the season ended. In 1967, he returned from his military service and signed with the Raiders. While with the Raiders, with mostly Daryle Lamonica as his quarterback, he was one of the most dangerous wide receivers in the league, finishing with over 20 yards per catch in all four seasons.

Wells started off his Raiders career with a week 2 appearance against the Denver Broncos. He made two catches for 96 yards with a touchdown, scoring from 50 yards from a George Blanda pass. He would appear in seven of the Raider games in the regular season, making thirteen catches for 302 yards with six touchdowns. In Super Bowl II, Wells had just one catch for 17 yards in the 33–14 loss to the Green Bay Packers (after making no catches against the Houston Oilers in the AFL title game). Wells would bounce further in 1968. As a starter for 12 games, Wells caught 53 passes for 1,137 yards for a league-leading 11 touchdowns. In the postseason run for the Raiders, he caught four passes for 93 yards for two touchdowns as Oakland advanced to the AFL title game with a 41–6 win over the Kansas City Chiefs. In the AFL Championship against the New York Jets, he caught three passes for 83 yards but the Raiders lost 27–23.

In 1969, he continued his run. He led the league in receiving yards (1,260) and touchdowns (14) while also averaging 90 yards per game. However, in the 1969 run to the postseason, he was held to just one catch for 24 yards in the loss. In 1970, he managed to snag 43 passes for 935 yards with 11 touchdowns. In the playoffs, Wells only played in the AFC Championship Game against the Baltimore Colts. He caught a touchdown pass from George Blanda to narrow the score to 20-17 in the fourth quarter, but Baltimore scored soon after to pull away. Wells was the lead receiver for the Raiders, having caught five passes for 108 yards and a touchdown. This turned out to be his last professional game.

He was an AFL All-Star in 1968 and an AFC-NFC All-Pro in 1970.  Until the league changed their guidelines for yards per reception counting for those with at least 200 receptions, Wells had the league record for yards per reception, having averaged 23.1 yards on 158 receptions.

Legal troubles
Before the 1971 season started, Wells' career was cut short following legal difficulties relating to his divorce and subsequent criminal charges.  Following the Pro Bowl game in Los Angeles on January 24, 1971, Wells was met by police in the locker room and arrested on a warrant for a probation violation originating from his conviction in 1969 for aggravated assault (Eugene Register Guard, Jan 25, 1971 "Warren Wells Nabbed After Tilt"). Further, according to an article in the Dallas Morning Star, dated July 7, 2016, (Flashback: DFW produces a ton of football talent, but another part of Texas is 'the pro football capital of the world') in 1969, he was charged with rape, a charge later reduced to aggravated assault. His probation was revoked in 1970 because he was drinking in a bar, a violation further complicated when a woman stabbed him in the chest. He missed the 1971 season while serving 10 months in a California prison. The Raiders released him in 1971 and he never played football again.

His personal life disintegrated further after his career was over. In 1976, he was arrested in Beaumont for robbery while panhandling. Also noted by the Bay Area newspapers during this time, Wells was arrested for carrying a gun in his car, and a judge, instead of sending him to prison, allowed him to enter Synanon House, a drug rehabilitation center.

Later life and death
Following his career, Wells continued to struggle with alcoholism and later dementia, but later became sober. Wells died in Beaumont, Texas, on December 27, 2018, from a heart attack at the age of 76. His brain was later sent to be tested for chronic traumatic encephalopathy.

See also
Other American Football League players

References

1942 births
2018 deaths
People from Franklin, Louisiana
American football wide receivers
Detroit Lions players
Oakland Raiders players
American Football League All-Star players
American Conference Pro Bowl players
Texas Southern Tigers football players
Players of American football from Louisiana
Sportspeople from Beaumont, Texas
American Football League players